Joseph Dries (born 2 August 1942) is a retired Belgian road cyclist who was active between 1962 and 1963. He won the Olympia's Tour in 1963 and one stage of Tour de Pologne in 1962.

References

1942 births
Living people
Belgian male cyclists
People from Lille, Belgium
Cyclists from Antwerp Province